Urkash is a lake in Kamysty District, Kostanay Region, Kazakhstan. 

Salt has been mined at the lake since the 19th century, mostly for household purposes.

Geography
Urkash is located in a sector of scattered small lakes of the western Turgay Plateau. Lakes of the area are both fresh water and saline. Most of the Urkash lakeshore is rocky, but the southern coastline is flat and marshy.
The lake is fed by groundwater and snow. River Sarybalkash is the main inflow of the lake. Its waters are salty.

Flora and fauna
Urkash belongs to the Zharsor-Urkash Lake System a  Ramsar site since 2007.
The southern shore of the lake is covered with reeds. The Zharsor-Urkash Lake System, of which the lake is a part, is a regular stopping site of the critically endangered siberian crane. The lake also provides a place for the nesting, migration and molting of wetland bird species, such as the white-fronted goose, common crane, little stint and curlew sandpiper.

See also
List of lakes of Kazakhstan
List of Ramsar Wetlands of International Importance

References

External links

Kazakhstan, National Report, 2021

Lakes of Kazakhstan
Kostanay Region